Hanazuki: Full of Treasures (also known as Hanazuki) is an American animated children's series produced by Titmouse, Inc. for Allspark Animation, a division of Hasbro and later by Boulder Media, with Stephen Davis of Allspark and Chris Prynoski of Titmouse serving as executive producers. Made in conjunction with a line of Hanazuki toys, it is based on characters and concepts which were developed by Hanneke Metselaar and Niko Stumpo before Hasbro purchased them in 2010. Set in a fictional galaxy comprising countless moons, the series follows Hanazuki, a childlike being called a Moonflower who uses her emotion-based powers to protect her home from being obliterated by a dark force known as the "Big Bad".

The series debuted on YouTube on January 12, 2017, and was produced in conjunction with a line of merchandise to be released later the same year, including a toyline and digital app. The series received praise from critics, drawing favorable comparisons to other animated series such as My Little Pony: Friendship Is Magic and Steven Universe for its storytelling, visual aesthetic, and darker undertones. As of May 2017, the series has amassed over 120 million views. It was renewed for a second season, and aired in March 2019. Titmouse announced a month before the season's debut that they ended production of the series, leaving it on a hiatus with only eight episodes and fifteen shorts languished in development hell, in order for Hasbro to find another studio to do the animation.

The series made its American televised debut on December 1, 2018, airing on Discovery Family.

Premise
The series is set in a fictional galaxy of moons that is beset by the "Big Bad", a black, inky miasma that drains the life and color of anything it touches. Each moon is protected by a Moonflower, a plantlike humanoid who uses their moods to activate magical "treasures" that are supplied by an infantile being named Little Dreamer, which can then be planted to grow trees that ward off the Big Bad. The series opens with Hanazuki, a newly born Moonflower, arriving on a moon populated by numerous denizens, including colorful rabbit-like creatures called Hemka. Several episodes focus on Hanazuki and her friends' escapades as she learns about her responsibilities and emotions, ending with her growing a colored Treasure Tree that corresponds with her mood in that episode. As the series progresses, Hanazuki encounters other Moonflowers that have failed at saving their own moons and seek to learn from Hanazuki in order to properly harness their powers against the Big Bad.

Episodes

Characters

Moonflowers
Moonflowers are childlike beings who are guardians of the galaxy's moons. Created by Little Dreamer, they have white flowers on their heads and highlights that change color depending on their moods, enabling them to grow Treasure Trees that protect their moons from the Big Bad.

 Hanazuki (Jessica DiCicco) – The titular protagonist of the series. A newly born Moonflower, Hanazuki is a kind, friendly, and optimistic girl who always offers help to those who need it. She is quick to adapt to her role as her moon's guardian, allowing her to understand and control her own emotions more successfully than most other Moonflowers.
 Kiazuki (Cassandra Lee Morris) – An older, cynical Moonflower who lives on a moon ravaged by the Big Bad. Although claiming to be more experienced than Hanazuki, Kiazuki has failed to ever grow a colored Treasure Tree of her own, and envies Hanazuki's success. She thus manipulates Hanazuki, who admires her as her "Moonflower sister", into helping her acquire treasures to restore her moon. She is later revealed to be the founder of the Garlandians, a failed emergency response team devised to combat the Big Bad.
 Kiyoshi (Vargus Mason) – A male Moonflower who protects a moon inhabited by unicorns. Because of his pessimistic nature, he is only able to grow black Treasure Trees, which are ineffective in warding off the Big Bad. Deposed and exiled for his failures, Kiyoshi receives guidance from Hanazuki to properly harness his emotional powers, eventually regaining authority of his moon.
 Maroshi (Marcus Toji) – A Moonflower from an ocean-covered world that is frozen and shattered by the Big Bad. Despite losing his home, he maintains a positive, laid-back attitude at all times, which makes him easy for others to get along with, but also appearing somewhat irresponsible. He is talented at flying through space on a surfboard-like device.
 Miyumi (Elise Dubois) - An outgoing & confident Moonflower who is always sure about herself despite not being mean. She can be irresponsible & self-centered since she prefers to enjoy herself. But in the end she realized that she can be totally responsible since she learned her lesson.

Hemka
The Hemka (or Hemkas) are small, rabbit-like creatures that inhabit Hanazuki's moon. They speak in gibberish that others except Hanazuki can fully understand, and they have malleable bodies that allow them to merge and change into different objects. Each Hemka is of a different color and represents a specific personality trait that Hanazuki reflects.

 Red Hemka (Colleen Villard) – A feisty Hemka prone to picking fights and pulling pranks on others.  Red often acts as the leader of the other Hemkas.
 Orange Hemka (Michael Sinterniklaas) – A wacky Hemka who often jumps around and makes silly faces.
 Yellow Hemka (Colleen Villard) – A happy Hemka who enjoys playing and remains optimistic in dangerous situations.
 Lime Green Hemka (Jessica DiCicco) – A scared Hemka who is easily startled by anything.
 Green Hemka (Michael Sinterniklaas) – A mellow Hemka who speaks with a laid-back tone.
 Teal Hemka (Michael Sinterniklaas in season 1, Cassandra Lee Morris in the shorts) – A glamorous Hemka.
 Blue Hemka (Jessica DiCicco) – A sad Hemka who is constantly crying or on the verge of tears.
 Lavender Hemka (Michael Sinterniklaas) – An inspired Hemka who has creative ideas but is too shy to act on them.
 Purple Hemka (Michael Sinterniklaas) – A courageous Hemka who performs feats of derring-do.
 Pink Hemka (Michael Sinterniklaas) – A loving Hemka who shows affection for everything.
 Raspberry Hemka (Cassandra Lee Morris) - A Hemka that is supposed to represent Hope
 Emerald Hemka (Avery Waddell) - A Hemka that represents Jealousy

Unicorns
Unicorns in the series are native to Kiyoshi's moon. They possess the same colors and personality traits as the Hemka, with the additional ability to perform magic using their horns. Most unicorns in the series are voiced by Debi Derryberry.

 Sleepy Unicorn (Avery Waddell) – A unicorn who lives on Hanazuki's moon and, as his name suggests, spends most of his time sleeping. Despite his relaxed and lazy nature, he harbors a troubled past; originally named Noble Unicorn, he lives in exile from his home moon after failing to stop his brother Twisted Unicorn's revolt against Kiyoshi. Convinced that he is unfit to wield magic because of his failure, Sleepy regains his confidence to use his powers again to help Hanazuki.
 Twisted Unicorn (Avery Waddell) – Sleepy Unicorn's brother and the leader of the unicorns. Twisted is a tyrant responsible for overthrowing Kiyoshi, forcing his fellow unicorns to maintain a force field he professes will protect their moon from the Big Bad. He is eventually deposed by the combined efforts of Hanazuki, Kiyoshi, and their allies, leading Twisted to hunt them across the galaxy for revenge.

Slooths
Sloth-like creatures that live on Miyumi's moon. The others were voiced by Cassandra Lee Morris.

 BB (Elise Dubois) - Miyumi's favorite teal Slooth who likes everything fabulous just like her.

Others
 Little Dreamer (Colleen Villard) – Hanazuki's infant-like creator who delivers treasures to the Moonflowers. He is shown sleeping at all times and wearing different-patterned pajamas almost every time he appears.
 Dazzlessence Jones (Avery Waddell) – The self-appointed sheriff of Hanazuki's moon who resembles a diamond. He helps Hanazuki maintain order, and speaks verbose words through song.
 Zikoro (Avery Waddell) – Kiazuki's sole companion on her moon, a black creature who behaves like a restless dog. He is regularly mistreated by Kiazuki, but remains loyal to her and enjoys tormenting the Hemka. After Kiazuki abandons him on Hanazuki's moon, he takes more of a liking to Hanazuki and her friends.
 Chicken Plant (Alison Martin) – A grouchy plant with the resemblance of a chicken that constantly tries eating the Hemka. She is prone to laying eggs that hatch into destructive monsters.
 Mirror Plant (Shondalia White) – A plant that translates an individual's thoughts and repeats what the subject says.
 Mazzadril (Michael Sinterniklaas) – One-eyed, four-legged beasts with horns on their heads and tentacles for mouths. Their natural habitat is the dark side of both Hanazuki's moon and Kiazuki's moon.
 Doughy Bunington (Pat Fraley) – A friendly gourmand hotdog who lives on the dark side of the moon, exiled there after thoughtlessly devouring Chicken Plant's wings.
 Basil Ganglia (Trevor Devall) – An egocentric, megalomaniacal brain who inhabits a cave on the moon's dark side. He has designs to take over Hanazuki's moon, but is helpless to carry them out due to his lack of other body parts.
 Flochi (Nika Futterman) – The creatures that inhabit Maroshi's moon, resembling fish with catlike faces. They glide across any surface in unison, with the exception of a lavender Flochi aptly named Wanderer for her more independent nature.
 Axo – (Gary Anthony Williams) An axolotl who is the Bouncer of the Cube: the club in the Dark Side who only likes silliness.
 Enormous Coal – (Dino Andrade) A coal like creature who lives in the Volcano of Fears who likes to brag about being big.
 Depriva – (Jennifer Hale) A flower on Hanazuki's moon who's so fabulous & likes to talk about it.
 Glow Worms – (Trevor Devall) Servants of Depriva.

Development and production

The original concept of Hanazuki was first developed in 2005 as an independent toy line by Norwegian art director Niko Stumpo and his Dutch partner, Hanneke Metselaar, under the self-formed Hanazuki Company in the Netherlands. Hasbro purchased the rights to the Hanazuki brand in 2010, with The Hanazuki Company being rebranded Thisisarobot. By 2013, Hanazuki was being developed as an interactive game for children from ages 7 to 12, with a scheduled release date for Fall 2014. A preview of Hanazuki was included in the 2013 United States home media release of Hasbro Studios' My Little Pony: Equestria Girls. On January 10, 2017, Hasbro announced Hanazuki as a web series that would premiere on their YouTube channel on January 12.

Release
Released beginning on January 12, 2017 on the property's official website and by Hasbro's official YouTube channel, the first season consists of 27 episodes, with the first 18 released in two sets of nine in accordance with the full moon of the lunar calendar. The remaining nine episodes were released weekly from May 19 to July 14, 2017. The series was available in multiple languages. In 2018, Hasbro has since de-listed all the full episodes off their YouTube channel following the decision to air the series via television networks.

In Canada, Hanazuki: Full of Treasures aired as a sneak peek on January 28, 2017 on Teletoon, Cartoon Network, YTV, and Disney Channel, all operated by Corus Entertainment.

In the United States, Discovery Family began broadcasting the first season on December 1, 2018.

Originally, season 2 was supposed to be released in 2018, but was delayed to 2019 instead.

The series also made its debut on foreign TV channels such as Pop in the United Kingdom, eToonz in South Africa, and ABC ME in Australia. Hanazuki was shown on the Russian TV channel "Carousel" approximately in 2017–2018.

Reception

Critical response
Hanazuki: Full of Treasures was met with critical praise and online popularity upon release, with several favorably comparing it to the television series My Little Pony: Friendship Is Magic (another Hasbro property) and Steven Universe for its light-hearted tone, visual aesthetic, and methodical storytelling. As of May 2017, the series has accumulated over 120 million views on YouTube.

In her review of the series, Lauren Orsini of Forbes commented on the involvement of Friendship Is Magic writer Dave Polsky as a story editor, considering Friendship Is Magic to be lucrative to Hasbro's success, and concluding that the series was an attempt by the company to incite similar success with Hanazuki. In a later article, Orsini attributed the series' popularity on YouTube to its "spunky characters and high production values". Mercedes Milligan of Animation Magazine said of the series, "Hanazuki puts a modern, cross-platform spin on a premise that will be familiar to '80s kids who grew up with Rainbow Brite, et al." Ella Anders of BSC Kids praised the opening episodes for its setting, lore, characters, and overarching storytelling. She additionally interpreted the series as a Western magical girl series that "doesn't play off the traditional magical girl path or tropes". Nathalie Medina of iDigitalTimes gave the series a score of 4 out of 5, complimenting the characters and hints of a more complex underlying story, and comparing its visual style to "a Lisa Frank folder with a 2000s aesthetic".

Awards and nominations

Other media

Merchandise
The web series was made in conjunction with a line of Hanazuki toys first announced at the 2017 New York Toy Fair, which was launched in June that same year. A digital app for the series was released for iOS and Android on April 4, 2017, offering a tie-in interactive video game along with episodes of the web series. A companion book authored by Brandon T. Snider, titled Hanazuki: Book of Treasures – The Official Guide, was released on November 7, 2017. A series of four chapter books set within the universe of the web-series was also announced, with the first book written by Stacy Davidowitz, titled Hanazuki: A Spark in the Dark, released on May 8, 2018.

Theatrical run
A Hanazuki short was released theatrically with Hasbro Studio's My Little Pony: The Movie on October 6, 2017, the plot of which focuses on Hanazuki as she tries to get a treasure back from the playful Yellow Hemka.

References

External links

2010s American animated television series
2010s American comic science fiction television series
2017 American television series debuts
2019 American television series endings
2017 animated television series debuts
2019 animated television series endings
2017 web series debuts
2019 web series endings
American children's animated space adventure television series
American children's animated comic science fiction television series
American children's animated science fantasy television series
American children's animated supernatural television series
Anime-influenced Western animated television series
Animated television series about extraterrestrial life
English-language television shows
Hasbro brands
Magical girl television series
Television series about the Moon
Television series about shapeshifting
Television series by Entertainment One
Television series by Hasbro Studios
Fiction about unicorns
2010s YouTube series
Discovery Family original programming